Barbara Bombi,  (born 1971) is an Italian historian and academic, specialising in medieval and ecclesiastical history. Since 2018, she has been Professor of Medieval History at the University of Kent. She was previously a researcher at the German Historical Institute in Rome, the University of Padua, and Corpus Christi College, Oxford.

Bombi studied medieval history at the Università Cattolica del Sacro Cuore in Milan, Italy, graduating with a Doctor of Philosophy (PhD) degree in 2000. Her research is focused on the High Middle Ages (1200-1450 AD), and includes the papacy, canon law, the Crusades, and the history of the Christian Military Orders.

In 2022, Bombi was elected a Fellow of the British Academy (FBA), the United Kingdom's national academy for the humanities and social sciences.

Selected works

References

Living people
1971 births
Italian historians
Italian medievalists
Women medievalists
Fellows of the British Academy
Academic staff of the University of Padua
Fellows of Corpus Christi College, Oxford
Academics of the University of Kent